Stick Men were a punk rock/no wave band from Philadelphia. Fronted by guitarist/painter/sculptor Peter L. Baker and keyboardist B.A.L. Stack, the earliest Stick Men lineup formed in 1977 and went through various member changes before settling on the group that would tour and record together in the early 1980s, featuring Chuck Mattern Jr. on vocals, saxophone, trumpet and electronics, Bill Bradfield on bass guitar, and Jim Meneses on drums/percussion.  In 1982 the band released their debut LP This is the Master Brew, followed by the EP Get on Board the Stick Men in 1983.

History
Peter L. Baker returned to Philadelphia after graduating from the Columbus College of Art and Design in 1977. In addition to working in the fields of avant-garde visual and performance art, Baker formed a musical group, The Undertakers of Love, with synthesizer work by Charles Cohen, keyboard from Jeff Cain, the bass playing of Art Noel, and poet J.W. McCullough joining Baker on guitars. The group performed in local bars before Baker met Beth "B.A.L." Stack in 1978. Baker and Stack played as the hollow-body guitar duo Blu Beth and the Gentleman Caller in Philadelphia's art gallery scene. Baker's two groups eventually merged with his performance art to form the Stick Men, shedding some members and by 1980 had enlisted George Shirley on drums, Michael McGettigan on the drum kit and bass, and Charles Mattern Jr. on trumpet, sax, and homemade drum devices. This new group entered Philly's punk rock scene and played gigs with The Contortions and Johnny Thunders, among others. For a time, Powelton Village`s bassist Lance Walker, who'd worked with Patti LaBelle and Buff, introduced a true touch of funk to the band. Pete, Beth, Michael and Lance recorded a demo and worked New York City`s punk scene.  

In 1981 Shirley was replaced by funk bassist Billy Bradfield, and McGettigan was swapped for percussionist Jim Meneses, forming the group's characteristic sound that mixed danceable disco and funk rhythms with less predictable art rock time changes and frenetic punk energy that draws comparisons to James Chance and the Contortions and The Minutemen. The Stick Men gained wider notoriety with the release of their debut 1982 album and opened for many famous musical acts including Gang of Four, The Slits, Lords of the New Church, Oingo Boingo, The Psychedelic Furs, Bush Tetras, The Pop Group, Nina Hagen and Wall of Voodoo. After extensive touring in the northeast U.S., one tour to the Midwest and the release of their second record, the Stick Men disbanded.

Aftermath
Peter L. Baker died in 1994 and a retrospective of the Stick Men's recordings was released in 2001 on Cuneiform Records. The CD, titled Insatiable, contains the entire Stick Men recorded output as well as songs from live radio broadcasts and a 20-minute live video of the band.  The reissue did not include the songs "Charmed" and "Kreskin Eye" as well as a combined dub remix of "Mystery Party" and "Personality Pollination" titled "The Flame Breathers Meet Wax Gumby in Iceland" from a 7" that was included with "This Is The Master Brew" that featured drummer "Disco" Fred Abrams instead of Meneses. Percussionist Jim Meneses and bassist Bill Bradfield are the only members reputed to be musically active. Meneses currently tours the world playing free improvisation. Bradfield now resides in San Luis Obispo, California where he participates in regular jam sessions with local Cal Poly students and aesthetes.

Discography
 This is the Master Brew LP (1982, Phantom Plaything Distributed by Red Records)
 Get on Board the Stick Men 12" EP (1983, Red Records)
 Insatiable CD retrospective (2001, Cuneiform Records)

References

Musical groups from Philadelphia
No wave groups
Punk rock groups from Pennsylvania
Cuneiform Records artists